Ryszard "Peja" Andrzejewski (born 17 September 1976 in Poznań) is a Polish rap musician, songwriter and producer. He is best known as the frontman of the Polish rap group Slums Attack. Peja was the recipient of the Fryderyk prize in 2002. In 2001 he played a role in the documentary movie "Blokersi". He has been featured in The New York Times and The Source. The Slums Attack broke up in 2016.

Peja has collaborated with such artists as Onyx, Jeru the Damaja, Masta Ace, AZ, Ice-T and Sweet Noise.

Personal life 
Ryszard Waldemar Andrzejewski was born on 17 September 1976 in the Jeżyce district of Poznań. He was raised in a working class family, his mother died when he was 12 years old. As described by Peja on the track "Doskonały Przykład", his father, Waldemar, was a life-long alcoholic and violent abuser who invited other degenerates to party in their home, and Peja's early life was marked by violence, as well as interventions by the police and social care. His father died in 1996 of a tumour.

Inspired by the 1988 Seoul Olympics, Ryszard took up judo training and trained as part of the Olimpia Poznań club in the years 1988–1995. Ryszard became a Polish Youth Judo Champion two times, in 1991 and 1992. In 2005, he received a silver badge from the Polish Judo Association for his contribution to the sport in the country.

He is an ardent supporter of Lech Poznań since he was 15 years old, and was active in the hooligan scene in the 90s.

Discography

Studio albums

Music videos

References

1976 births
Gangsta rappers
Living people
Musicians from Poznań
Polish rappers